David Norman (born 1 April 1942) is a former Australian rules footballer who played with Collingwood in the Victorian Football League (VFL) during the 1960s.
 
Norman starred for North Ballarat in the 1960 BFL season and won the league's "Best and Fairest" award, known as the Henderson Medal. The following season he joined Collingwood where he would spend six seasons as a rover and small forward.

Known for his strength and courage, Norman appeared as a half forward flanker in the 1964 VFL Grand Final but ended up on the losing team. He kicked a career high 40 goals that year, bettering his 36-goal effort in 1962. Neither were enough to top Collingwood's goal-kicking but he earned that accolade in 1965 when he booted 32 goals. Norman also twice kicked six goals in a game during his career, both times against North Melbourne.

He finished his career back in the Ballarat Football League, with Beaufort.

References

1942 births
Australian rules footballers from Victoria (Australia)
Collingwood Football Club players
North Ballarat Football Club players
Beaufort Football Club players
Living people